Mimoropica is a genus of beetles in the family Cerambycidae, containing the following species:

 Mimoropica biplagiata Breuning & de Jong, 1941
 Mimoropica fascicollis (Breuning, 1940)
 Mimoropica spinipennis Breuning, 1942
 Mimoropica sumatrana Breuning, 1942

References

Apomecynini